Inder Shekar Reddy (born 20 December 1980) is an Indian former cricketer. He played seventeen first-class matches for Hyderabad between 2001 and 2006.

See also
 List of Hyderabad cricketers

References

External links
 

1980 births
Living people
Indian cricketers
Hyderabad cricketers
Cricketers from Hyderabad, India
Hyderabad Heroes cricketers